Lourdes Domínguez Lino was the defending champion, having won the event in 2012, but she chose not to defend her title.

Andrea Petkovic won the title, defeating Anabel Medina Garrigues in the final, 6–4, 6–2.

Seeds

Main draw

Finals

Top half

Bottom half

References 
 Main draw

Open Feminin De Marseille - Singles